The 1940 Duquesne Dukes football team was an American football team that represented Duquesne University as an independent during the 1940 college football season. In its second season under head coach Aldo Donelli, Duquesne compiled a 7–1 record and outscored opponents by a total of 118 to 54.

Schedule

References

Duquesne
Duquesne Dukes football seasons
Duquesne Dukes football